The Rush 31 is a French sailboat that was designed by Ron Holland as an International Offshore Rule Half Ton class racer and first built in 1979.

The Rush 31 design was developed into a whole family of derivative racers, including the GTE, RDF, TDF, Regatta, Royal and the Rush Royale 31. It was also licensed to Cal Yachts in the United States and sold as the Cal 9.2.

Production
The design was built by Jeanneau in France, from 1979 until 1985, with 580 boats completed, but it is now out of production.

Design

The Rush 31 is a racing keelboat, built predominantly of fiberglass, with wood trim. It has a masthead sloop rig, a raked stem, a reverse transom, an internally mounted spade-type rudder controlled by a tiller and a fixed fin keel. It displaces  and carries  of iron or lead ballast.

The boat is fitted with a French Renault Couach diesel engine for docking and maneuvering.

The design has sleeping accommodation for three people, with a single "V"-berth in the bow cabin and two straight settee berths in the main cabin. The galley is located on the port side at the companionway ladder. The galley is "L"-shaped and is equipped with a two-burner stove, an ice box and a sink. A navigation station is opposite the galley, on the starboard side. The head is located just aft of the bow cabin on both sides.

Operational history
The boat is supported by an active class club that organizes racing events, the Half Ton Class.

In its Rush Royal Standard model it was chosen as the one-design boat for the Tour de France à la voile for 1982-1983.

See also
List of sailing boat types

Related development
Rush Royale 31

References

External links

Keelboats
1970s sailboat type designs
Sailing yachts
Sailboat type designs by Ron Holland
Sailboat types built by Jeanneau
Tour de France à la voile